Knud Asbjørn Wieth-Knudsen  (January 8, 1878 - February 22, 1962) was a Danish author, economist and composer.

See also
List of Danish composers

References
This article was initially translated from the Danish Wikipedia.

External links
 

Danish composers
Male composers
1878 births
1962 deaths
Burials at Hellerup Cemetery